Biography

Seyed Ali Salehi (born April 1954 in Khuzestan) is a contemporary Iranian poet and writer. He is one of the founders of the Pure Wave movement and the founder of the speech poetry and meta-speech poetry in contemporary Iranian poetry. He was also one of the main secretaries of the Writers' Association of Iran. Salehi is a prominent and well-known figure in contemporary Persian poetry.

Seyed Ali Salehi was born on April 1, 1954 in the village of Marghab in the Izeh Bakhtiari district of Khuzestan province to a farming family. His father was a farmer, poet and Shahnameh reader. In 1974, he was expelled from school due to punishment and threats by the school and the authorities, and a year later he returned to school and received a diploma in mathematics.

His first poems were published by Masjed Soleiman Oil Company in the local magazine of Abolghasem Halat.

Salehi is credited with the establishment of the mawj-e nab literary movement, and promoting shi'r-e guftar (speech poetry) in Iran. In 1978, he received the Forough Farukhzad Award for poetry.  He was nominated for the Nima Literary Award in 2010, but refused his nomination.

References 

20th-century Iranian poets
1954 births
Living people
21st-century Iranian poets